Common Knowledge? An Ethnography of Wikipedia is a 2014 book about Wikipedia's community of contributors. The author is Dariusz Jemielniak, who is a Wikipedia contributor himself.

Summary
The book has eight chapters, each of which discusses a different aspect of Wikipedia.

Prologue
The author begins by describing that he was in a dispute on Wikipedia from September 2008 – February 2009. He and the other involved parties went through the dispute resolution process, which ended in admonishments for all involved, including a 1-day block for the author. The author reflected on his own behavior, recognizing some poor actions and wondering how all of these things came to happen. In response to the experience the author looked more deeply at how Wikipedia works socially. The anecdote establishes that the author is experienced as a Wikimedia community member and knows how to observe community deliberative processes.

Introduction
There are contemporary negative attitudes to Wikipedia among academics. Michael Gorman, a prominent librarian, disparages Wikipedia as harmful. The author, in contrast, states that he is an academic, and that he recommends Wikipedia for academic and other uses.

Wikipedia is an open collaboration community and such communities are a new paradigm in research and discourse. Among open collaboration communities, Wikipedia is highly successful for producing information of great breadth and quality and for engaging people to share information.

Wikipedia in short
Wikipedia is an encyclopedia and a wiki. When those two concepts were brought together to form Wikipedia, it was an instant success, attracting a large international community of contributors who created encyclopedia articles on many topics in many languages.

Different language Wikipedias have different communities of editors who developed different rule sets. Some popular rules are common in almost all languages of Wikipedia communities, even if they might be interpreted differently in different languages. For example, one quality standard in Wikipedia is "notability", which is the term for describing whether a concept merits an article in Wikipedia. All Wikipedias have some standard for notability, but the standards for notability in one language may differ from others.

The "Wikimedia community" oversee the development of Wikipedia and Wikimedia projects. Researchers have attempted to describe the Wikipedia community with various statistics, including counting its participants, quantifying their activities, reporting demographic surveys, and categorizing the content they submit to the encyclopedia. The Wikimedia community creates its own rules. One rule is "no personal attacks", which is a civility standard. Consensus decision-making is the norm for establishing agreement, while straw polls and other conversation tools advance the discussion. Other rules include avoiding conflict of interest editing, and respecting copyright.

In September 2012, author Philip Roth complained publicly in the media about Wikipedia's presentation of his book The Human Stain. The episode highlighted that people and works who are the subject of Wikipedia articles cannot overrule Wikipedia's own rules for management of those articles.

Wikimedia community members often sort themselves into interest groups called WikiProjects. Individual members often adopt a user name rather than use their offline name. Users present themselves with profiles describing their interests and what they do in the encyclopedia.

Formal roles and hierarchy
The author notes that Andrew Keen's 2007 work The Cult of the Amateur criticized Wikipedia as having a community without culture that produced information which was unreliable and chaotic. A range of academic descriptions of Wikipedia's community are summarized.

Wikipedia's own hierarchy of formal roles is named and ordered: steward, checkuser, oversighter, bureaucrat, administrator, rollbacker, registered user, newly registered user, unregistered user, blocked user. Stewards are elected positions who can perform any technical function and are only limited by social norms. To be elected, stewards must be highly experienced, have great trust from the community, and typically be fluent in a non-English language. The author reveals that he has served as steward. For the other roles, the community entrusts certain sensitive technical rights to certain trusted users who have a demonstrated need to use them.

Counting the number of edits which a user makes to Wikipedia is not an indication of the respect that the Wikimedia community has for that person. However, users who have made large numbers of quality content contributions to Wikimedia projects tend to get more respect. Experienced users are conscious of the edit counts of other users. A user's edit count is the single best available metric which correlates with Wikipedia experience and productivity. There are other factors which experienced editors use to evaluate the contributors of other editors. One prominent system of evaluation is the "request for adminship" process, in which users who pass a peer evaluation may receive administrator rights. Since 2006, many users have described the system both as flawed and the best idea which the community has for this process.

Academic models of power sharing are summarized.

Conflict resolution on Wikipedia
Conflict resolution is the most common social interaction in Wikimedia projects. This is often achieved through consensus building which the author compares to Quaker approaches. The author argues that conflict and dissent are motivations for editing and Wikimedia community celebrates dissent.  The satisfaction of seeking consensus is a major motivation in why Wikimedia community members engage. In closing the author argues Wikipedia is a "community of dissensus" where the possibility of legitimate positions authority is dismissed.

The author profiles the exceptionally large dispute around the name for the city Gdańsk, and how the matter played out between 2003 and 2005. The case was a matter of fairly representing cultures, including Polish and German perspectives. Wikipedia provided a forum to position various community representatives with strong opinions to face each other and create a definitive and sufficiently neutral compromise. The author argues that when disputes are factual resolution tends to be reached, but consensus can be less likely if there are differences in point of view. An academic models for the possible outcomes for point of view conflicts is summarized.

Bureaucracy and control
Editing Wikimedia projects is like a panopticon in the sense that there is a permanent, public log of all activity. The nature of Wikipedia permits a level of regulation which surpasses many traditional concepts of bureaucratic control. Relationships among Wikimedia community members are less about social bonds between individuals and more about the ties between individuals and the community. When users wish to request any of the services which Wikipedia offers, that request goes into a specialized queue which solicits an appropriate user to respond, rather than relying on interpersonal relationships to sort requests. Community members who routinely perform specialized activities do gain a reputation and might become regular collaborators with other users with whom that work overlaps. While the Wikimedia Foundation does have authority for some tasks, the community manages almost all on-wiki activity.

A primary mechanism of control in Wikipedia is version control. Whatever action anyone takes, other people can track the changes.

When there is a dispute about content, Wikipedia offers mediation. Typical mediators have a record of experience and usefulness in Wikipedia.

In discussions on Wikipedia, there are published technical and social guidelines. Experienced users are expected to follow the procedures. However, inexperienced users or anyone who slips in the procedure will not have their submission discredited on that basis. The Wikipedia community designates some guidelines on Wikipedia as informal, and others as formal policies. As of November 2013, the word count for the official policies is 150,000, which is the equivalent to a 450-page book. Estimating the size of the unofficial guidelines is challenging with the technical tools available, but it must be millions of words.

Academic theories and models of bureaucracy are summarized. There is a learning curve for newcomers in Wikipedia and various internal mentorship programs available to help editors to become oriented. The Wikimedia community uses the rules as a way to prevent over-reliance on any particular leaders's engagement with the project.

Trust in people and trust in procedures
Wikipedia's system of pseudonymity means that most users establish an on-wiki identity which may be different from their offline identity. The community rejects the idea of checking credentials, so any offline reputation typically will not result in on-wiki respect or deference. There is no routine check on who is adding content to Wikipedia. One reason for these systems is to encourage non-experts to contribute content.

Academic descriptions of trust in online communities are summarized. The 2006 Essjay controversy is presented in which a Wikipedia contributor presented himself as an academic expert in theology and cited his authority as justification for editorial decisions. After accepting certain honors, the user revealed that he had no credentials and that his online identity was a hoax.  The case was significant for solidifying community opinion that Wikipedia relies on citing quality published sources rather than any claims citing authority or claims otherwise made without citing sources. Academic descriptions of how users can check credentials in online communities are summarized. The Wikipedia community trusts that when people follow the established procedures, then their actions will meet the needs of typical contributors. There are many ways in which a non-expert or amateur can develop Wikipedia content in collaboration with everyone else, including experts.

Between anarchy and bureaucracy
Some aspects of Wikimedia projects, particularly those which require action offline and outside the website, require governance and leadership outside of the web platform's control. There are heated discussions about the non-profit Wikimedia organization's governance. Just as anyone may contribute to any Wikipedia editorial conversation, anyone can join conversations about the Wikimedia Foundation, its budget, the activities of the Wikimedia chapters of volunteers who organize for their own projects, or any individual project.

Leadership transformed
As founder of Wikipedia, Jimmy Wales has a unique relationship with the Wikipedia community. The Wikimedia community has recognized him as a classical authority figure. His primary role is as a spokesperson for the movement.

The knowledge revolution at the gates
The author describes his role in the Wikimedia movement, asserting 6 years of ethnographic research while also being a community member. Academic criticisms of Wikipedia's overall model are summarized.

Reviews
A reviewer for Vice called the book "both primer and detailed study on the habits of Wikipedians".

A writer for Inside Higher Ed said that the "book offers a management expert's inside view of how it has tried, for better or worse, to arrive at a self-sustaining and novel form of self-management".

In Pacific Standard, the reviewer said the book was "a detailed ethnographic study of a paradoxical culture that is at once egalitarian and hierarchical, rule bound and consensus driven, collaborative and conflict driven".

In Forbes, the reviewer gave summaries of concepts covered, including Wikipedia's rule sets, tension between experienced and inexperienced contributors, conflicts between subject matter experts and fact checkers, and the implications of Wikipedia having a large audience.

An academic reviewer for European Management Review stated their recognition that the book's author had a unique insight into the workings of the Wikimedia community. They commented that the book had a bias for English and Polish language Wikipedia communities due to the author's participation in those communities. They recommended the book as a way to understand Wikipedia, for insights into online communities, or even for learning about aspects of online communities by reading particular chapters without reading the entire book.

See also
 Bibliography of Wikipedia
For information on the administrative structure of Wikipedia, see Wikipedia:Administration

References

External links

2014 non-fiction books
Books about Wikipedia
Stanford University Press books
Ethnographic literature